Progress MS-16, Russian production No. 445, identified by NASA as Progress 77P, was a Progress spaceflight operated by Roscosmos to resupply the International Space Station (ISS). This was the 168th flight of a Progress spacecraft.

History 
The Progress-MS is an uncrewed freighter based on the Progress-M featuring improved avionics. This improved variant first launched on 21 December 2015. It has the following improvements:

 New external compartment that enables it to deploy satellites. Each compartment can hold up to four launch containers. First time installed on Progress MS-03.
 Enhanced redundancy thanks to the addition of a backup system of electrical motors for the docking and sealing mechanism.
 Improved Micrometeoroid (MMOD) protection with additional panels in the cargo compartment.
 Luch Russian relay satellites link capabilities enable telemetry and control even when not in direct view of ground radio stations.
 GNSS autonomous navigation enables real time determination of the status vector and orbital parameters dispensing with the need of ground station orbit determination.
 Real time relative navigation thanks to direct radio data exchange capabilities with the space station.
 New digital radio that enables enhanced TV camera view for the docking operations.
 The Ukrainian Chezara Kvant-V on board radio system and antenna/feeder system has been replaced with a Unified Command Telemetry System (UCTS).
 Replacement of the Kurs A with Kurs NA digital system.

Launch 
A Soyuz-2.1a launched Progress MS-16 to the International Space Station from Baikonur Cosmodrome Site 31 on 15 February 2021 following a two-day, 34-orbit rendezvous profile. Progress MS-16 was docked on 17 February 2021, 06:26:47 UTC, using manual docking system operated by Expedition 64 commander Sergey Ryzhikov to the Pirs module of the ISS, where it remained until 26 July 2021, 10:55 UTC.

Cargo 
On 4 February 2021, Roscosmos said that Progress MS-16 had been installed back into its processing stand inside the assembly building at Site 254 for final pre-launch operations and loading of fresh food items in its cargo bay. The ship's cargo included 600 kg of propellant for refueling, 420 kg of drinking water in the Rodnik system, 40.5 kg of pressurized gases with extra nitrogen supplies and 1,400 kg of various equipment and supplies, including the repair kit with reinforced glue patches for temporary sealing of the Transfer Chamber, PrK, in the Zvezda Service Module (SM).

 Dry cargo: 
 Propellant: 
 Pressurized Gases: 
 Drinking Water:

Undocking and decay 
The Progress MS-16 was expected to remain docked at the station until 23 July 2021, 12:45 UTC, when it would depart with the Pirs module docked to it for destructive reentry four hours later over the South Pacific Ocean, which would also mark the first module to be decommissioned from use aboard the International Space Station. The Nauka module, which would replace Pirs after its fiery reentry and subsequent destruction, was launched on 21 July 2021 at 14:58:25 UTC, for docking on 29 July 2021, at 13:25 UTC. However, due to post-launch telemetry and propulsion issues with Nauka, the undocking of Progress MS-16 was delayed to 26 July 2021, at 10:55 UTC. The spacecraft, together with the Pirs module, was successfully deorbited on the same day at 14:51 UTC.

Gallery

See also 
 Uncrewed spaceflights to the International Space Station

References 

Progress (spacecraft) missions
2021 in Russia
Supply vehicles for the International Space Station
Spacecraft launched by Soyuz-2 rockets
Spacecraft launched in 2021
Spacecraft which reentered in 2021